Maple Hill, Ontario may refer to three communities:

Maple Hill, Bruce County, Ontario
Maple Hill, South Frontenac, Ontario
Maple Hill, York Regional Municipality, Ontario, a hamlet located south of Ravenshoe, Ontario

See also
 Maple Hill (disambiguation)